Butyrophenone is an organic compound with the formula C6H5C(O)C3H7.  It is a colorless liquid.

The butyrophenone structure—a ketone flanked by a phenyl ring and a butyl chain—forms the basis for many other chemicals containing various substituents. Some of these butyrophenones are used to treat various psychiatric disorders such as schizophrenia, as well as acting as antiemetics.

Examples of butyrophenone-derived pharmaceuticals include:
 Haloperidol, the most widely used classical antipsychotic drug in this class
 Benperidol, the most potent commonly used antipsychotic (200 times more potent than chlorpromazine)
 Droperidol, Antiemetic for postoperative nausea and vomiting

References 

Aromatic ketones
Phenyl compounds